Smith Township, Ohio may refer to:

Smith Township, Belmont County, Ohio
Smith Township, Mahoning County, Ohio

Ohio township disambiguation pages